David Edward Cooper (born 1942) is Emeritus Professor of Philosophy at Durham University.

Life and work
David E. Cooper is a British author and philosopher. He was brought up in Surrey and educated at Highgate School and then St Edmund Hall, Oxford, the University at which he was given his first job in 1967, as a Lecturer in Philosophy. He went on to teach at the universities of Miami, London and Surrey before being appointed, in 1986, as Professor of Philosophy at Durham University – where he remained until retiring in 2008. During his academic career, David was a Visiting Professor at universities in the United States, Canada, Malta, Sri Lanka and South Africa. In 2022 he was Distinguished International Visiting Professor at Peking University. Cooper is the former Chair (or President) of the Aristotelian Society, the Mind Association, the Friedrich Nietzsche Society, and the Philosophy of Education Society of Great Britain. He is Secretary and a Trustee of the charity Project Sri Lanka, and he spends time each year visiting and supervising educational and humanitarian projects.

Cooper has published across a broad range of philosophical subjects, including philosophy of language, philosophy of education, ethics, aesthetics, environmental philosophy, animal ethics, philosophy of technology, philosophy of religion, history of both Western philosophy and Asian philosophy, and modern European philosophy, especially Heidegger, Nietzsche, and Wittgenstein. In recent years, Cooper has written widely on environmental and Buddhist aesthetics, music and nature, the relationship of beauty and virtue, cultures of food, the significance of gardens, Daoism, our relationship to animals, the notion of mystery, and philosophical pessimism and misanthropy.

Cooper is the author of a large number of books, including World Philosophies: An Historical Introduction, Meaning, Existentialism: A Reconstruction, The Measure of Things: Humanism, Humility and Mystery, A Philosophy of Gardens, Convergence with Nature: A Daoist Perspective, Senses of Mystery: Engaging with Nature and the Meaning of Life, and Animals and Misanthropy. He has also edited a number of collections, including Blackwell Companion to Aesthetics, Philosophy: The Classic Readings, Epistemology: The Classic Readings, Ethics: The Classic Readings and Aesthetics: The Classic Readings – the latter four notable for their inclusion of material from the Indian and Chinese traditions. He is joint editor of Key Thinkers on the Environment. Cooper is a regular reviewer of books for magazines, including The Times Literary Supplement and The Los Angeles Review of Books. He is also the author of four novels, all set in Sri Lanka:Street Dog: A Sri Lankan Story, its sequel, Old Stripe, A Shot on the Beach. and The Crossjack Club. He has also published several short stories.

Books authored 

 Philosophy and the Nature of Language (London: Longman, 1975).
 Illusions of Equality (London: Routledge, 1980).
 Authenticity and Learning: Nietzsche's Educational Philosophy (London: Routledge, 1983).
 Metaphor (Oxford: Blackwell, 1986).
 Heidegger (London: Claridge, 1996).
 World Philosophies: An Historical Introduction, 1st ed. (Blackwell, 1996).
 Existentialism: A Reconstruction (Oxford: Blackwell, 1999).
 The Measure of Things: Humanism, Humility and Mystery (Oxford: Oxford University Press, 2002).
 World Philosophies: An Historical Introduction, 2nd ed. (Blackwell, 2003).
 Meaning (Chesham, Bucks: Acumen, 2003).
 Buddhism, Virtue and Environment (with Simon P. James) (Aldershot: Ashgate 2005).
 A Philosophy of Gardens (Oxford: Oxford University Press, 2006).
 Convergence with Nature: A Daoist Perspective (Dartington: Green Books, 2012).
 Sunlight on the Sea: An Essay in Phenomenology (Kindle ebook, 2013).
 Senses of Mystery: Engaging with Nature and the Meaning of Life (Abingdon: Routledge 2017).
 Animals and Misanthropy (Abingdon: Routledge 2018).
 Street Dog: A Sri Lankan Story (Colombo: Sarasavi 2018)
 Old Stripe: A sequel to Street Dog (Amazon 2019)
 A Shot on the Beach (Colombo: Jam Fruit Tree Publications 2020)
 The Crossjack Club (Amazon 2022)

Selected recent articles 
 2018. ‘‘Growing Your Own’: Gardens, Plants, and the Good Life’, in A. Kallhoff, M. di Paola, and M. Schörgenhumer (eds.), Plant Ethics: Concepts and Applications (London: Routledge), in press.
 2018. ‘Cloud, Mist, Shadow, Shakuhachi: The Japanese Aesthetics of the Indistinct’, in Nguyen Minh (ed.), New Essays in Japanese Aesthetics (Lanham, MD: Lexington Books), in press.
 2018. ‘Zhuangzi and the Meaning of Life’, in Stephen Leach and James Tartaglia (eds.), The Meaning of Life and the Great Philosophers (London: Routledge), pp. 49–55.
 2018. ‘Daoism, Natural Life, and Human Flourishing’, in Laura Hartman (ed.), That All May Flourish: Comparative Religious Environmental Ethics (Oxford: Oxford University Press), pp. 77–90.
 2017. ‘Meditation on the Move: Walking and the Appreciation of Nature’, in Peter Cheyne (ed.), Coleridge and Contemplation (Oxford: Oxford University Press), pp. 35–46.
 2017. ‘Superstition, Science, and Life’, in Jonathan Beale and Ian James Kidd (eds.), Wittgenstein and Scientism (London: Routledge), pp. 28–38.
 2016. ‘Music and the Presence of Nature’, in Bryan E. Bannon (ed.), Nature and Experience: Phenomenology and the Environment (London: Rowman and Littlefield), 175–186. 
 2015. ‘Animals, Attitudes and Moral Theories’, in Ian James Kidd and Liz McKinnell (eds.), Science and the Self: Animals, Evolution, and Ethics: Essays in Honour of Mary Midgley (New York and Oxford: Routledge), pp. 19–30.
 2012. ‘Schopenhauer and Indian Philosophy’, in Bart Vandanabeele (ed.), A Companion to Schopenhauer (Oxford: Wiley-Blackwell), pp. 266–279.
 2012. ‘Existentialism as a Philosophical Movement’, in Steven Crowell (ed.), The Cambridge Companion to Existentialism (Cambridge: Cambridge University Press), pp. 27–49.
 2012. ‘The Intimacy of Art and Nature’, in Emily Brady and Pauline Phemister (eds.) Human-Environment Relations: Transformative Values in Theory and Practice (Dordrecht: Springer), pp. 85–96. 
 2012. ‘Should Ruins be Preserved?’, in Geoffrey Scarre and Robin Coningham (eds.) Appropriating the Past: Philosophical Perspectives on the Practice of Archaeology (Cambridge: Cambridge University Press), pp. 222–236
 2010. ‘Edification and the Experience of Beauty’, in Wang Keping (ed.), International Yearbook of Aesthetics: Diversity and Universality in Aesthetics (Beijing: Institute for Transcultural Studies), pp. 62–80.
 2009. ‘Mystery, World, and Religion’, in John Cornwell and Michael McGhee (eds.), Philosophers and God: On the Frontiers of Faith and Reason (London: Continuum), pp. 51–62.
 2009. ‘Visions of Philosophy’, in Anthony O’Hear (ed.), Conceptions of Philosophy, Royal Institute of Philosophy Supplement 65. Cambridge: Cambridge University Press, pp. 1–13.
 ‘Mystery, World, and Religion’, in John Cornwell and Michael McGhee (eds.), Philosophers and God: On the Frontiers of Faith and Reason (London: Continuum, 2009), pp. 51–62.
‘Beautiful people, beautiful things’, British Journal of Aesthetics 48/3 (2009): pp. 247–260.
 ‘Art, nature, significance’, The Philosopher's Magazine 44 (2009): pp. 27–35.
‘Visions of Philosophy’, in Anthony O’Hear (ed.), Conceptions of Philosophy, Royal Institute of Philosophy Supplement 65 (Cambridge: Cambridge University Press, 2009), pp. 1–13.
 ‘Music, education, and the emotions’, Journal of Chinese Philosophy 36.4 (2009): pp. 642–652.
 ‘Food, Environment, and the Good Life’, in Cathy Farnworth, Janice Jiggins, and Emyr Vaughtn Thomas (eds.), Creating Food Futures: Trade, Ethics, and the Environment (Aldershot: Gower, 2008), pp. 203–214.
 ‘Teaching and truthfulness’, Studies in Philosophy and Education 27 (2008): pp. 79–87.
 ‘Postmodernism’, in Randall Curren (ed.), A Companion to the Philosophy of Education (Oxford: Blackwell, 2009), pp. 206–217.
 ‘Metaphor and Derrida’s Philosophy of Language’, in Robert Eagleston (ed.), Derrida’s Legacies: Literature and Philosophy (London: Routledge, 2008), pp. 45–53.
(with Simon P. James) Buddhism and the Environment, special issue of Contemporary Buddhism 8/2 (2007).
 (with Simon P. James) 'Buddhism and the environment', Contemporary Buddhism 8/2 (2007): pp.93–96.
 ‘Finding the music again’, The Philosopher’s Magazine 38 (2007), pp. 45–46.
 ‘Truthfulness and ‘Inclusion’ in Archaeology’, in Chris Scarre and Geoffrey Scarre (eds.), The Ethics of Archaeology: Philosophical Perspectives on Archaeological Practice (Cambridge, Cambridge University Press, 2006) pp. 131–45.
 ‘Nature, aesthetic engagement, and reverie’, Nordic Journal of Aesthetics 33/34 (2006): 96–106.
 2006. ‘Caravaggio in Malta’, Kultura 10 (2006): pp. 3–5.
 ‘Heidegger on nature’, Environmental Values 14 (2005): pp. 339–351.
 ‘Life and meaning’, Ratio XVIII (2005): pp. 125–137.
 ‘The Persistence of Beauty’, in C. Entzenberg and S. Säätela (eds.), Perspectives on Aesthetics, Art and Culture (Stockholm: Thales, 2005), pp. 69–80.
 ‘Gardens, Art, Nature’, in Noël Kingsbury and Tim Richardson (eds.), Vista: The Culture and Politics of Gardens (London: Francis Lincoln, 2005), pp.5–12.
 ‘Søren Kierkegaard’, in Robert Solomon and David Sherman (eds.), The Blackwell Guide to Continental Philosophy (Oxford: Blackwell, 2003), pp. 43–61.
 ‘Nietzsche and the analytical ambition’, Journal of Nietzsche Studies 26 (2003): pp. 1–11.
 ‘In praise of gardens’, British Journal of Aesthetics 43 (2003): pp. 101–13.
  ‘Ideology, Moral Complicity, and the Holocaust’, in Eve Garrad and Geoffrey Scarre (eds.), Moral Philosophy and the Holocaust (Aldershot: Ashgate, 2003), pp. 9–24.
  ‘Nietzsche’, in Nicholas Bunnin (ed.), The Blackwell Companion to Philosophy 2nd ed. (Malden, MA., Blackwell, 2003). 
 ‘The ‘Frankensteinian’ Nature of Biotechnology’, in Andreas-Holger Maehle and Johanna Geyer-Kordesch (eds.), Historical and Philosophical Perspectives on Biomedical Ethics (Aldershot: Ashgate, 2002), pp.139–150.
 ‘Truth, Science, Thinking, and Distress’, in Michael A. Peters (ed.), Heidegger, Education, and Modernity (Oxford: Rowman and Littlefield, 2002), pp. 47–63.
 ‘Emptiness: Interpretation and metaphor’, Contemporary Buddhism 3/1 (2002): pp. 7–20.
  ‘Philosophy, Environment and Technology’, in Anthony O’Hear (ed.), Philosophy at the Millennium, Royal Institute of Philosophy Lectures (Cambridge: Cambridge University Press, 2001), pp. 141–153.
 ‘Collective Responsibility, ‘Moral Luck’, and Reconciliation’, in Aleksandar Jokić (ed.), War Crimes and Collective Wrongdoing (Malden, Mass.: Oxford: Blackwell, 2001), pp. 205–215.
 ‘The virtue of practical reason and moral respect across cultures’, Contemporary Philosophy (2000), 22: pp. 20–28.

See also
 American philosophy
 British philosophy
 List of American philosophers

References

External links
 http://www.3ammagazine.com/3am/the-measure-of-things/
 https://www.youtube.com/watch?v=bywWUOp-KHI
 https://www.routledge.com/posts/13468

Academics of Durham University
Living people
People educated at Highgate School
Alumni of St Edmund Hall, Oxford
20th-century British philosophers
21st-century British philosophers
Philosophy academics
Presidents of the Aristotelian Society
1942 births